Olaru, meaning "potter", is a Romanian surname and may refer to:

Costică Olaru (born 1960), Romanian canoer
Dan Olaru (born 1996), Moldovan archer
Darius Olaru (born 1998), Romanian footballer
Maria Olaru (born 1982), Romanian gymnast
Nicolae Olaru (born 1958), Moldovan politician
Nuța Olaru (born 1970), Romanian runner
Raluca Olaru (born 1989), Romanian tennis player

Romanian-language surnames
Occupational surnames